John Q. Ross (June 28, 1873 – May 12, 1922) was an American politician who served as the 34th lieutenant governor of Michigan from 1911 to 1915.

References

1873 births
1922 deaths
Lieutenant Governors of Michigan
Michigan Republicans
20th-century American politicians